The Distinguished Eagle Scout Award (DESA) is a distinguished service award of the Boy Scouts of America (BSA). It is awarded to an Eagle Scout for distinguished service in his profession and to his community for a period of at least 25 years after attaining the level of Eagle Scout. Other requirements include significant accomplishment in one's career and a solid record of continued community volunteer involvement. It is one of only two BSA awards given to adults that is dependent upon the recipient's having been awarded Eagle Scout as a youth; the other is the NESA Outstanding Eagle Scout Award (NOESA). Recipients of the DESA are known as Distinguished Eagle Scouts.

Award
The award consists of a gold eagle suspended from a red, white, and blue ribbon worn around the neck. Recipients may wear a small gold eagle device on the Eagle Scout square knot on the Scout uniform. The neck ribbon and medallion is the same design as the Eagle Scout medal. The Distinguished Eagle Scout medal is worn in place of the regular Eagle Scout medal for Eagle Scout-related ceremonies. The recipient is also presented with an engraved bronze plaque featuring a gold eagle.

History
The DESA was first introduced in 1969 and is awarded by the National Eagle Scout Association. Prior to the establishment of the Distinguished Eagle Scout Award, a "gold Eagle Scout badge" was awarded to Daniel Carter Beard at the Second National Training Conference of Scout Executives held in 1922 in Blue Ridge, North Carolina. This was the only time this gold badge was awarded.

The DESA does not have a clear order of issue like the numbers assigned to each NOESA recipient, though the majority have a date of rank as a Distinguished Eagle recorded.  On January 16, 1969 the first ten DESAs were approved.  Alphabetically, Alden G. Barber is the first DESA recipient.  Based upon the date of the original Eagle Scout rank, Zenon C.R. Hansen, who earned Eagle Scout in 1921, is the first.

Of the nine Eagle Scouts who received the Medal of Honor for valor in combat, five were eligible for the DESA (four received the MOH posthumously and are therefore not eligible).  Of those five, three have been awarded the DESA: Mitchell Paige, Leo K. Thorsness, and Thomas R. Norris.  The other two died in 2007 without a DESA nomination being processed.  Col. Paige died in 2003 and Col. Thorsness in 2017, leaving Norris as the only living Eagle/DESA Medal of Honor recipient.

Of the 24 men who traveled to the Moon, three were Eagle Scouts: Neil Armstrong, Jim Lovell, and Charles Duke.  All three were awarded the DESA.  Armstrong and Lovell are also among the 28 recipients of the Congressional Space Medal of Honor and both also received the Silver Buffalo Award.

Recipients

References

External links

Advancement and recognition in the Boy Scouts of America
Long service medals